Pré-en-Pail is a former commune in the Mayenne department in north-western France. On 1 January 2016, it was merged into the new commune of Pré-en-Pail-Saint-Samson.

See also 

 Communes of Mayenne
 Parc naturel régional Normandie-Maine

References 

Preenpail
Maine (province)